Martin Flanagan is an Irish former Gaelic footballer from Tyrrellspass, Westmeath who played for the Westmeath county team from 1995 to 2010.

Flanagan is considered to be one of the finest talents the county has ever produced, but retired without a Leinster medal to his name after falling out of favour with then manager Páidí Ó Sé during the successful 2004 campaign. Equally at home at midfield or full forward, he made his championship debut against Wexford in 1995 and went on to win National Football League Division 2 medals in 2001, 2003 and 2008.

Flanagan played his club football with Tyrrellspass, winning Westmeath Senior Football Championship medals in 1999, 2006 and 2007.  He also played in the Leinster Senior Club Football Championship final in 2007 however Tyrrellspass lost out to Dublin side St Vincents

Honours
 Leinster College's Senior A Championship as Captain of St. Mel's College Longford in 1994. (1): 1994
North Leinster Colleges Senior A League with St. Mel's College Longford  (1): 1991 
Leinster Senior Football Championship (1): 2004
National Football League, Division 2 (3): 2001, 2003, 2008
Westmeath Senior Football Championship (3): 1999, 2006, 2007

References

Year of birth missing (living people)
Living people
Tyrrellspass Gaelic footballers
Westmeath inter-county Gaelic footballers